Gorka Kijera Salaberria (born 26 May 1986) is a Spanish professional footballer who plays as a left back for Real Unión.

Club career
Born in Hernani, Gipuzkoa, Kijera graduated from Real Sociedad's youth system, but made his debut as a senior with lowly CD Hernani. In the summer of 2007, he joined SD Lemona of Segunda División B.

On 17 June 2008, Kijera moved to Athletic Bilbao, being assigned to the reserves also in the third division. In November, he terminated his contract alleging personal reasons, and returned to his hometown club.

Kijera signed a two-year deal with SD Eibar on 14 July 2009. On 20 June 2011 he joined FC Cartagena, and played his first match as a professional on 9 October, starting in a 0–0 draw against Gimnàstic de Tarragona in the Segunda División.

On 5 July 2012, after the Murcians' relegation, Kijera moved to Real Unión. He featured regularly during his only season, totalling nearly 3,000 minutes of action.

On 11 July 2013, Kijera returned to Eibar now in the second tier. He appeared sparingly in the 2013–14 campaign, as the Basque side was promoted to La Liga for the first time ever.

Kijera cut ties with the Armeros on 27 August 2014, signing with CD Mirandés a day later. On 24 July 2020, having spent the majority of his spell as team captain, the 34-year-old left after his contract expired.

References

External links

1986 births
Living people
People from Hernani
Spanish footballers
Footballers from the Basque Country (autonomous community)
Association football defenders
Segunda División players
Segunda División B players
Tercera División players
Primera Federación players
Real Sociedad B footballers
CD Hernani players
SD Lemona footballers
Bilbao Athletic footballers
SD Eibar footballers
FC Cartagena footballers
Real Unión footballers
CD Mirandés footballers